Antonino Barillà (born 28 November 1987) is an Italian sports shooter. He competed in the men's double trap event at the 2016 Summer Olympics. Barillà is an athlete of the Gruppo Sportivo della Marina Militare.

References

External links
 

1987 births
Living people
Italian male sport shooters
Olympic shooters of Italy
Shooters at the 2016 Summer Olympics
Place of birth missing (living people)
Universiade medalists in shooting
Mediterranean Games silver medalists for Italy
Mediterranean Games medalists in shooting
Competitors at the 2013 Mediterranean Games
Universiade bronze medalists for Italy
Shooters of Marina Militare
European Games medalists in shooting
European Games bronze medalists for Italy
Medalists at the 2011 Summer Universiade
Medalists at the 2013 Summer Universiade
21st-century Italian people